Pine Harbor is an unincorporated community and census-designated place in Marion County, Texas, United States. Its population was 810 as of the 2010 census. In 2020, its population was 785.

Geography

Demographics 

As of the 2020 United States census, there were 785 people, 266 households, and 177 families residing in the CDP.

References

Unincorporated communities in Marion County, Texas
Unincorporated communities in Texas
Census-designated places in Marion County, Texas
Census-designated places in Texas